Giorgi Gabedava  (born 3 October 1989) is  Georgian football player, who plays as a forward. He was also international player for Georgia national under-21 football team.

External links

 
  UEFA Profile

1989 births
Living people
Footballers from Georgia (country)
Association football forwards
FC Mariupol players
FC Zugdidi players
FC Gagra players
FC Chikhura Sachkhere players
FC Samtredia players
FC Dinamo Batumi players
Zagłębie Sosnowiec players
FC Saburtalo Tbilisi players
FC Dinamo Tbilisi players
Hapoel Acre F.C. players
Erovnuli Liga players
Ukrainian Premier League players
Ekstraklasa players
Liga Leumit players
Expatriate footballers from Georgia (country)
Expatriate footballers in Poland
Expatriate footballers in Ukraine
Expatriate footballers in Israel
Expatriate sportspeople from Georgia (country) in Poland
Expatriate sportspeople from Georgia (country) in Ukraine
Expatriate sportspeople from Georgia (country) in Israel